Guazamara is a village located in the municipality of Cuevas del Almanzora, in Almería province, Andalusia, Spain. As of 2020, it has a population of 597.

Geography 
Guazamara is located 92km northeast of Almería.

References

Populated places in the Province of Almería